Cora Meek (1889–2001) was an American quilter and supercentenarian. Her work is included in the collections of the Smithsonian American Art Museum, the Tarble Arts Center at Eastern Illinois University  and the Art Institute of Chicago.

References

1889 births
2001 deaths
American supercentenarians
Women supercentenarians
20th-century American women artists
American textile artists
Women textile artists